Lucile Harris Bluford (July 1, 1911 Salisbury, North Carolina - June 13, 2003, Kansas City, Missouri) was a famous journalist and opponent of segregation in America's education system, and after whom the Lucile H. Bluford Branch of the Kansas City Public Library is named.

Early life 
Lucile Bluford was born in Salisbury, North Carolina, to John Henry Bluford and Viola Harris Bluford. Bluford's father was a professor at the state's Agricultural and Technical College. In 1921 when Bluford was 10, and upon the death of his mother, John Bluford accepted a position teaching science at Lincoln High School in Kansas City, Missouri.  Bluford attended Wendell Phillips Elementary and Lincoln High School. At a young age  Bluford was exposed to segregated education, as Missouri was a Jim Crow state that adhered to "separate but equal" doctrine.

Career 

Bluford was encouraged in her interest in journalism by a high school English teacher, Trussie Smothers, at the segregated Lincoln High School.She was the valedictorian of her 1928 graduating class. After high school, she attended the University of Kansas School of Journalism with honors in 1932. Bluford was the second Black student to ever study at the KU journalism program, and served as night editor and telegraph editor on the school's student newspaper. After graduating, Bluford worked for The Daily World in Atlanta, reneging on her promise to work at the Call. She worked on the school newspaper and yearbook, and after school, at the Black-owned newspaper, the Kansas City Call. Her career at the Kansas City Call lasted for 69 years. Bluford made weekly newspapers which addressed the unfair treatment of African Americans and the paper fought for racial justice. Upon returning to Kansas City, she worked for the Black-owned weekly, The American.  Chester A Franklin, founder of the Call, contacted Bluford and told her he had an opening for her at his newspaper. She began working for the Kansas City Call in 1932. She stayed at the Call for the entirety of her career, rising through the ranks until she was the second editor and publisher of the newspaper. After Franklin's death in 1955, Bluford became part-owner with Franklin's widow, Ada Crogman Franklin, and continued to work at the newspaper until her death.

The Law Suits 
In 1939, Bluford applied to the Master of Journalism program at the renowned Missouri School of Journalism in Columbia, Missouri, and her application was originally accepted but once she showed to enroll she was denied because of her race.  At the time Bluford attempted to enroll, African-American students were expected to attend all-Black Lincoln University in Jefferson City, Missouri, 30 miles away from the Columbia, Missouri, university campus.

What sparked Ms. Bluford's interest in suing the University of Missouri is the law suit of Lloyd L. Gaines. Gaines filed a law suit against the University of Missouri which eventually went to the Supreme Court. The Court ruled that the University must allow the acceptance of Black students into the law school. 

On October 13, 1939, with the help of Charles Huston of the NAACP, Bluford filed the first of several lawsuits against the University. Due in part to her association with the NAACP, Bluford was denied admission to the University of Missouri's graduate journalism program. MU officials insisted she must enroll in Lincoln University's journalism program, even though Lincoln had no such program. By 1941, her case had made it to the Missouri Supreme Court, but she lost. Citing low attendance because of World War II, the University of Missouri subsequently closed its graduate journalism program. The case prompted the opening of a School of Journalism at Lincoln University. After 11 attempts, Bluford never attended the University of Missouri.

Legacy 
Bluford has been called the "Matriarch" and the "Conscience" of Kansas City. The University of Missouri honored Bluford with an honorary doctorate degree in 1989. The University also named a residence hall in her honor in 2018. The State of Missouri recognizes July 1 as Lucile Bluford Day to honor her contributions to journalism and the state. In 2002, Bluford received the Kansas Citian of the Year Award from the Greater Kansas City Chamber of Commerce. Bluford also received a Distinguished Service Award from the NAACP.

Honors and Awards

References

External links
 Significant African Americans in Mizzou History

People from Salisbury, North Carolina
University of Missouri people
1911 births
2003 deaths
Philanthropists from the Kansas City metropolitan area
20th-century American philanthropists